Illicium peninsulare is a species of plant in the family Schisandraceae. It is a tree endemic to Peninsular Malaysia. It is threatened by habitat loss.

Nomenclature 
Illicium comes from the Latin illicio meaning "entice".  Peninsulare means one who cames from a peninsula.

Description 
Illicium peninsulare tree is a Small tree, with height up to 10 m, and girth up to 60 cm. The Leaves are Leathery, stiff and tough, but somewhat flexible. They are elliptic, in shape with a midrib impressed above and very prominent below, apex acute to short acuminate, and base attenuate. The Petioles are 11-20 mm long, grooved on adaxial surface. Flowers are axillary on young growth, generally solitary and the pedicels are 1-7 mm long at anthesis. The Perianth parts are 15-25 mm, yellowish white in color. The outermost perianth parts broadly ovate, reduced, 2-2.9-3.5 by 2.8-3.5-4.8 mm and the largest perianth parts ovate, 6.5-7.9-9.6 by 5–6.2-7 mm. The innermost perianth parts ovate, 3.5 by 1.6 mm. The Androecium of 20-33(-39) stamens are arranged in two rows, the stamens are 2.6-2.8-3 mm long. Pollen grains trisyncolpate. Gynoecium are made up of 12 or 13 carpels and the carpels are 3.2-3.7-4 mm long. Fruit of up to 13 follicles.

Habitat 
The Illicium peninsulare trees can be seen growing in Montane forests between 450 and 1520 m altitude.

Distribution 
The Illicium peninsulare tree is endangered and is found in Peninsular Thailand; Malesia: Malay Peninsula (Perak, Pahang, Selangor, Malacca, and Johore).

References

peninsulare
Endemic flora of Peninsular Malaysia
Trees of Peninsular Malaysia
Conservation dependent plants
Taxonomy articles created by Polbot